Thierry Cerez (born 11 June 1976) is a French former competitive figure skater. He is the 1995 World Junior silver medalist and the 1998 French national champion. His highest placement at the European Championships, 14th, came in 1994 and 1998, while his best result at the World Championships, 12th, came in 1996.

Programs

Results
GP: Champions Series / Grand Prix

References

 Skatabase: 1990s Worlds Results
 Skatabase: 1990s Europeans Results
 Skatabase: 1990s Junior Worlds Results

1976 births
Living people
People from Évry, Essonne
French male single skaters
World Junior Figure Skating Championships medalists
Sportspeople from Essonne